The NME (or New Musical Express) was a British weekly popular music newspaper. Record charts in the United Kingdom began on 14 November 1952 when NME imitated an idea started in American Billboard magazine compiled their own hit parade. Until 15 February 1969, when the British Market Research Bureau (BMRB) chart was established, many periodicals compiled their own charts. During this time the BBC used aggregated results of the prominent NME, Melody Maker, Disc, Record Mirror and, later, Record Retailer charts to compile their Pick of the Pops chart. Prior to 1969 there was no universally accepted source or "official" singles chart; however, the Official Chart Company and Guinness' British Hit Singles & Albums regard the canonical sources for this period as NME before 10 March 1960 and Record Retailer from then until the BMRB took over in 1969. Although Record Retailer is now the most predominantly used source for charting music in the 1960s, NME had the biggest circulation of charts in the decade and was more widely followed. After the BMRB was formed, the NME continued compiling its own chart up until 14 May 1988.

The Allisons' entry for the Eurovision Song Contest, entitled "Are You Sure?", was the first single to be number one on the NME chart but not to reach the top spot on Record Retailers chart. In total, sixteen songs failed to reach number one with Record Retailer but topped the NME chart. In 1969, after the BMRB chart was introduced, four songs topped the NME but not the BMRB chart. Notable discrepancies include "19th Nervous Breakdown", which reached number one for The Rolling Stones on the NME, Disc, and Melody Maker charts, topped the BBC's Pick of the Pops aggregated chart and was announced as number one on Top of the Pops; however, because it did not reach number one on the Record Retailer chart, it is omitted from the Official Chart Company's canon. The Beatles' "Please Please Me" suffered the same fate so, arguably, should be considered The Beatles' first number-one single. Conversely, Elvis Presley's double A-side, "Rock-A-Hula Baby"/"Can't Help Falling in Love", reached number one on all charts except NME because the entries were split by NME according to which song was requested when the shop returned its figures.


Number-one singles

Notes

References
Footnotes

Sources

Lists of number-one songs in the United Kingdom
New Musical Express
1960s in British music